is a Japanese all female a cappella group. Known for their performance of the works of Bach, Chopin, Schubert and other classical composers and traditional European folk music. The group was formed by Nahoko Kakiage, the recognized creator of classical crossover style of music in Japan.

Membership

Current members
Hanae Tomaru – Soprano
Kazuyo Kitazume – Mezzo Soprano
Misako Ito – Soprano
Kai Torii – Mezzo Soprano, since 2018

Previous Members
Tateishi Rei (立石玲) - Soprano, left in 2002
Michiko Takahashi (高橋美千子) - Soprano, left in 2006
Etsuko Murata (村田悦子) - Alto, left in 2007
Yoshiko Ikeshiro (池城淑子) – Soprano, left in 2009
Akiko Tano – Mezzo Soprano

Discography
Ensemble Planeta アンサンブル・プラネタ（2001）
Maiden's Lament 乙女の嘆き（2002）
ARIA 麗しのアリア（2003）
étoile エトワール（2003）
romance 愛のロマンス（2004）
Choral コラール（2005）
Largo ラルゴ（2006）
A Capella - The Japanese Lyrical Songs ア・カペラ-日本の叙情歌（2009）
Eternal Harmony (Compilation) プラチナムベスト アンサンブル・プラネタ -永遠のハーモニー（2015）
This Flower この花（2018）
Planeta (compositions by Kakiage Nahoko) (2019)

Performances
They have also made TV/CM appearances over the years such as the TV commercial for pharmaceutical company ARAX’s Norshin. They also sang the theme song for the Spanish movie El Viaje De Carol and performed the soundtrack for the Studio Ghibli animation movie Taneyamagahara No Yoru. They are also constantly touring, playing concert halls all across Japan as well as performances in Korea and Hong Kong.

References

External links
Ensemble Planeta Official Website

A cappella musical groups
Japanese vocal groups
Pony Canyon artists
Musical groups established in 2001